MTCH may refer to:

Cap-Haïtien International Airport, ICAO airport code
Match Group, stock symbol